Nakkirar I (c. 250 BCE) was a poet of the Sangam period, who composed anthologies including the Neṭunalvāṭai. He also wrote verse 7 of the Tiruvalluva Maalai.

See also

 Sangam literature
 List of Sangam poets
 Tiruvalluva Maalai

Notes

References

Tamil philosophy
Tamil poets
Scholars from Tamil Nadu
Tiruvalluva Maalai contributors
Sangam poets